Bystrzyca Łomnicka (German: Kressen Bach Weistritz, Weistritz, Hungarian: Lomnici-Beszterce) is a river in south-western Poland. It is a left tributary of the Nysa Kłodzka (Eastern Neisse) and is about 25.5 km long.

Its sources are located in the northern Bystrzyckie Mountains. It enters Nysa Kłodzka in Bystrzyca Kłodzka.

References

Rivers of Poland
Rivers of Lower Silesian Voivodeship